Stark Street is an east-west-running street in Portland, Oregon, in the United States. The street is named after Benjamin Stark, and Southeast Stark Street and Southwest Stark Street are divided by the Willamette River.

In late 2017, activists proposed renaming Southwest Stark Street for gay rights activist Harvey Milk, noting that Stark was an unapologetic racist who advocated for slavery. In June 2018, the city council approved renaming that 13-block stretch of Stark, which is entirely within downtown, as SW Harvey Milk Street. The name change took effect immediately upon the council's approval of the ordinance enacting it.

In Washington County, West Stark Street acts as the dividing line between the streets prefixed with Northwest and those with Southwest.

On the east side of the Willamette River and in parts of Washington County, Stark Street follows the Willamette Baseline.

See also

 LGBT culture in Portland, Oregon

References

External links
 

Harvey Milk
LGBT culture in Portland, Oregon
Streets in Portland, Oregon